Perry's Probe was a Canadian half-hour investigative journalism television series, hosted by Norm Perry, which aired on CTV in the 1968-69 television season. The show began on CFTO-TV as a local television series before going national. It aired at 2:30 PM weekdays. It lasted just the one season.

External links 
 Perry's Probe at the Canadian Communications Foundation

1968 Canadian television series debuts
1969 Canadian television series endings
CTV Television Network original programming
1960s Canadian television news shows